Refojos de Riba de Ave is a former civil parish in the municipality of Santo Tirso, Portugal. In 2013, the parish merged into the new parish Carreira e Refojos de Riba de Ave. It is located 6 southeast of the city of Santo Tirso.

References

Former parishes of Santo Tirso